The Stockholm Court House is situated on Kungsholmen in Central Stockholm, Sweden. The building is connected to the Stockholm Police House through an underground pedestrian walkway. The Stockholm City Court was situated in the building from 1915 to 1971 and Stockholm District Court from 1971.

The building was designed in the National Romantic style, and was constructed between 1909 and 1915. The architecture was influenced by the Castles of the Vasa era, and it bears a resemblance to Vadstena Castle. 

A fire ravaged the third floor of the south/left wing of the building in June 2008.

See also
 Architecture of Stockholm
 Historical fires of Stockholm

References

External links

Courthouses
Buildings and structures in Stockholm
Government buildings in Sweden
National Romantic architecture in Sweden
Art Nouveau architecture in Stockholm
Art Nouveau government buildings
Government buildings completed in 1915
1915 establishments in Sweden
Court
Office buildings in Sweden